Pretty Things is a 2001 French drama film written and directed by Gilles Paquet-Brenner, based on the 1998 novel Les Jolies Choses by Virginie Despentes. It won the Prix Michel d'Ornano at the 2001 Deauville American Film Festival. In the film, Marion Cotillard portrays twins of completely opposite characters, Lucie and Marie. She was nominated for a César Award for Most Promising Actress for her performance.

Cast

Awards and nominations

In popular culture
The name of the film is an answer to a pop trivia game in The Office episode "Trivia".

References

External links
 
 
 

2001 films
2001 directorial debut films
2001 drama films
2000s French-language films
Films about twin sisters
Films based on French novels
Films directed by Gilles Paquet-Brenner
French drama films
2000s French films